The 2020–21 Adelaide Strikers Women's season was the sixth in the team's history. Coached by Luke Williams and captained by Suzie Bates, the Strikers played the entirety of WBBL06 in a bio-secure Sydney hub due to the COVID-19 pandemic. They finished the regular season in sixth place, missing out on qualifying for the finals.

Squad 
Each 2020–21 squad was made up of 15 active players. Teams could sign up to five 'marquee players', with a maximum of three of those from overseas. Marquees are classed as any overseas player, or a local player who holds a Cricket Australia national contract at the start of the WBBL|06 signing period.

Personnel changes made ahead of, and during, the season included:

 New Zealand marquee Sophie Devine departed the Strikers after five seasons with the team, signing with the Perth Scorchers.
 South Africa marquee Laura Wolvaardt returned to the league after a season's absence, signing with the Strikers. Wolvaardt had previously been a member of two WBBL campaigns with the Brisbane Heat.
 Madeline Penna signed with the Strikers, having played with the Melbourne Stars in WBBL05 as an injury replacement.
New Zealand marquee Katie Perkins was signed from the reserve player pool, replacing Suzie Bates (shoulder) for the match on 26 October.
Megan Schutt stood in as captain for the first seven games of the season, replacing Suzie Bates who was sidelined with a shoulder injury originally sustained a month earlier during New Zealand's tour of Australia. Bates joined the line-up on 10 November against the Melbourne Stars but aggravated her shoulder injury during the match and was forced to the leave the field immediately. She was ruled out for the remainder of the tournament, and Schutt took over as acting captain again for the final six games of the season.

The table below lists the Strikers players and their key stats (including runs scored, batting strike rate, wickets taken, economy rate, catches and stumpings) for the season.

Ladder

Fixtures 

All times are local time

Statistics and awards 
 Most runs: Laura Wolvaardt – 347 (11th in the league)
Highest score in an innings: Laura Wolvaardt – 68 (50) vs Melbourne Stars, 3 November
Most wickets: Sarah Coyte – 18 (equal 4th in the league)
Best bowling figures in an innings: Amanda-Jade Wellington – 4/24 (3 overs) vs Brisbane Heat, 14 November
Most catches: Tahlia McGrath, Bridget Patterson – 5 each (equal 16th in the league)
Player of the Match awards: Madeline Penna, Katie Mack, Tegan McPharlin, Stafanie Taylor, Amanda-Jade Wellington, Laura Wolvaardt – 1 each
WBBL06 Team of the Tournament: Sarah Coyte, Darcie Brown (12th man)
WBBL06 Young Gun: Darcie Brown (winner)
Strikers Most Valuable Player: Sarah Coyte

References 

2020–21 Women's Big Bash League season by team
Adelaide Strikers (WBBL)